The Moyes XT is an Australian high-wing, single-place, hang glider that was designed and produced by Moyes Delta Gliders of Botany, New South Wales. Now out of production, when it was available the aircraft was supplied complete and ready-to-fly.

Design and development
The XT is an intermediate-level hang glider made from aluminum tubing, with the mostly single-surface wing covered in Dacron sailcloth. It was marketed as easy to fly, possessing a low stall speed and responsive handling. The aircraft was produced in two sizes named after its wing area in square feet, to accommodate pilots of different weight ranges.

Variants
XT145
Small-sized model for lighter pilots. Its  span wing is cable braced from a single kingpost.
XT165
Large-sized model for heavier pilots. Its  span wing is cable braced from a single kingpost.

Specifications (XT145)

References

External links

XT
Hang gliders